Marie-Pier Boudreau Gagnon (born March 3, 1983 in Rivière-du-Loup, Quebec) is a Canadian synchronized swimmer and four times Commonwealth Games gold  medalist.

Career
She first became interested in synchronized swimming at the age of seven after watching Sylvie Fréchette on television, and has been a member of Synchro Canada's national team since 1998.

Marie-Pier represented Canada in the women's solo event at the 2005 FINA World Championships in Montreal. At the 2006 Commonwealth Games Gagnon won two gold medals in the women's solo and women's duet (with Isabelle Rampling). She repeated this feat at the following Commonwealth Games with a further two golds.

At the 2008 Summer Olympics, Marie-Pier finished in sixth place with partner Isabelle Rampling in the women's duet. She returned to 2012 Summer Olympics where an improved performance in the women's duet saw her finish in fourth place with Élise Marcotte.

Shortly after the London Olympics, Boudreau Gagnon announced her retirement from competitive sports.

References

External links 
Synchro Canada Official website

1983 births
Canadian synchronized swimmers
Commonwealth Games gold medallists for Canada
French Quebecers
Living people
Olympic synchronized swimmers of Canada
People from Rivière-du-Loup
Sportspeople from Quebec
Synchronised swimmers at the 2006 Commonwealth Games
Synchronised swimmers at the 2010 Commonwealth Games
Synchronized swimmers at the 2007 Pan American Games
Synchronized swimmers at the 2008 Summer Olympics
Synchronized swimmers at the 2011 Pan American Games
Synchronized swimmers at the 2012 Summer Olympics
World Aquatics Championships medalists in synchronised swimming
Synchronized swimmers at the 2011 World Aquatics Championships
Synchronized swimmers at the 2009 World Aquatics Championships
Synchronized swimmers at the 2007 World Aquatics Championships
Synchronized swimmers at the 2005 World Aquatics Championships
Pan American Games gold medalists for Canada
Pan American Games silver medalists for Canada
Commonwealth Games medallists in synchronised swimming
Pan American Games medalists in synchronized swimming
Medalists at the 2011 Pan American Games
Medallists at the 2006 Commonwealth Games
Medallists at the 2010 Commonwealth Games